The Australia–Chile Free Trade Agreement is a trade agreement between the countries of Chile and Australia. It was signed on July 30, 2008 and went into effect in the 1st quarter of 2009. The agreement was intended to go into effect on January 1, 2009, but was delayed due to Chile not being able to finish its ratification in time.

Trade between Chile and Australia is modest, involving A$856m in 2007. Australia is the fourth largest provider of foreign direct investment in Chile with over A$3 billion in 2007. Chile ranks as Australia's 41st trading partner.  Australia's main exports to Chile were coal (A$94 million) and civil engineering equipment (A$21 million). Trade from Chile is copper (A$96 million), and pulp and waste paper (A$57 million).

When enacted, the Agreement calls for Chile to eliminate tariffs on 91.9% of tariffs which cover 96.9% of trade from Australia. Australia will cut 90.8% of tariffs which cover 97.1% of trade from Chile. By year six of the Agreement (2015), all tariffs will be discarded except for Chile's sugar tariff which will remain subject to its current ‘price band’ system. The tariffs in Australia, that will stay in place until 2015, will be relating to textile and the clothing industry along with table grapes. In Chile, the agreement will protect the textile and clothing industry and some other manufactured products.

According to the Australian Government, the government hopes to use the Agreement as a model for other free trade agreements with other countries.

Before passage of the Agreement farmers and horticulturists protested the Agreement in front of the Australian Parliament. The protesters claim that this agreement would undercut Australian food producers by allowing in cheap food goods from Chile. Simon Crean, Australia's Minister for Trade, responded to the farmers concerns by stating that tariffs are quite low or in some cases nonexistent due to previous international trade agreements.

Chile and Australia agreed in principle to start negotiations on December 8, 2006. Negotiations started on July 18, 2007 and after four rounds of talks, concluded on May 27, 2008.

See also 
 Australia–Chile relations
 Australia New Zealand Closer Economic Relations Trade Agreement
 Australia-United States Free Trade Agreement
Rules of Origin
Market access
Free-trade area
Tariffs

References

External links 
 Free trade agreement at
 Australia DFAT
 Australia Customs
 Aduanas de Chile
 Foreign Ministry Chile
 Tariff Schedule of Australia, English, Spanish
 Tariff Schedule of Chile, English, Spanish

Free trade agreements of Chile
Free trade agreements of Australia
Treaties concluded in 2008
Treaties entered into force in 2009
Australia–Chile relations
2008 in Australian law